Queen Jaui (d. 681) or Queen Janul (자눌왕후, 慈訥王后), of the Gyeongju Kim clan, was a Korean queen consort. She was the spouse of king Munmu of Silla. She was a first cousin once removed of Queen Seondeok and Princess Cheonmyeong.

Family 
 Father - Lord Kim Seon-pom (김선품, 金善品) (607 - 643)
 Grandfather - Kim Gu-ryun (김구륜, 金仇輪)
 Grandmother - Princess Bohwa (보화공주); second wife of Kim Gu-ryun
 Mother - Princess Boryong (보룡궁주 김씨) 
 Grandfather - Lord Kim Bori (보리공, 菩利公) (573 - ?)
 Grandmother - Princess Manryong of the Gyeongju Kim clan (만룡낭주 김씨); first wife of Lord Kim Bori
 Uncle - Lord Kim Yewon (예원공)
 Sibling(s)
 Brother - Kim Su-won (김순원, 金順元)
 Niece - Queen Sodeok of the Gyeongju Kim clan (소덕왕후 김씨)
 Nephew-in-law - Kim Yong-gi, King Seongdeok of Silla (성덕왕) (? - 737); was the 33rd King of Silla
 Niece - Queen Hyemyeong of the Gyeongju Kim clan (혜명왕후 김씨)
 Nephew-in-law - Kim Seung-gyeong, King Hyoseong of Silla (효성왕) (? - 742); was the 34th King of Silla
 Nephew - Kim Jeong-jong (김정종)
 Younger sister - Kim Woon-myeong (김운명, 金雲明), Lady Kim of the Gyeongju Kim clan
 Brother-in-law - Lord Kim Oh-gi (오기공)
 Nephew - Kim Dae-mun (김대문, 金大問)
 Younger sister - Princess Yamyeong of the Gyeongju Kim clan (야명궁주 김씨)
 Brother-in-law - Yi Beob-min, Munmu of Silla (문무왕) (626 - 21 July 681)
 Nephew - Prince Inmyeongjeon (인명전군)
 Husband - Kim Beob-min, Munmu of Silla (문무왕) (626 - 21 July 681)
 Father-in-law - Kim Chun-chu, Muyeol of Silla (603 - 661); was the 29th King of Silla 
 Mother-in-law - Kim Mun-hui (김문희, 金文姬), Queen Munmyeong of the Gimhae Kim clan (문명왕후) (610 - 681)
 Issue 
 Son - Crown Prince Somyeong (소명태자)
 Son - Kim Jeong-myeong, Sinmun of Silla (신문왕) (? - 692); was the 31st King of Silla
 Daughter-in-law - Deposed Queen Kim of the Gyeongju Kim clan (폐비 김씨)
 Daughter-in-law - Queen Sinmok of the Gyeongju Kim clan (신목왕후 김씨) (655 - 700)
 Grandson - Kim Yi-hong, King Hyoso of Silla (효소왕) (687 - 702); was the 32nd monarch of Silla
 Grandson - Kim Yong-gi, King Seongdeok of Silla (성덕왕) (? - 737); was the 33rd King of Silla
 Grandson - Kim Geun-jil (김근질, 金根質)
 Grandson - Kim Sa–jong (김사종, 金詞宗)

References

  Il-yeon: Samguk Yusa: Legends and History of the Three Kingdoms of Ancient Korea, translated by Tae-Hung Ha and Grafton K. Mintz. Book Two, page 79. Silk Pagoda (2006). 

7th-century births
681 deaths
Royal consorts of Silla
7th-century Korean women